Ken Stephanson (born November 13, 1941) was a Canadian retired professional ice hockey defenceman who played 106 games in the World Hockey Association for the Winnipeg Jets and Ottawa Nationals.

External links

1941 births
Living people
Baltimore Clippers players
Canadian ice hockey defencemen
Ice hockey people from Manitoba
Ottawa Nationals players
Sportspeople from Selkirk, Manitoba
St. Boniface Canadiens players
Winnipeg Jets (WHA) players